Front Street in Philadelphia, Pennsylvania is a north–south street running parallel to and near the Delaware River. In 1682, when the city was laid out by William Penn, it was the first street surveyed and built in the new colony of Pennsylvania.  As part of the King's Highway, which extended from Boston to Charleston, South Carolina, and as the waterfront of Philadelphia's port, it was the most important street in the city from its founding into the nineteenth century.

Front Street is the origin street of Philadelphia's numbered streets. There is no First Street, Front Street exists in its place, and numbered streets begin at the next major block with Second Street, about one-tenth mile west.

At least three stations of SEPTA's Market–Frankford Line are built above Front Street. They include Girard Station, Berks Station, and  York–Dauphin Station. SEPTA gives the address of also Spring Garden Station as Front Street, by which pedestrians have access, but its platform lies in the median of Interstate 95 over Spring Garden Street, just west of Front Street.

Historic sites
The South Front Street Historic District, which includes numbers 700–712 on the west side of South Front, is a historic district listed on the National Register of Historic Places. The district includes three buildings individually listed on the NRHP as well, Widow Maloby's Tavern (700), Capt. Thomas Moore House (702), and the Nathaniel Irish House.

Four sites listed on the National Register adjoin North Front Street: Elfreth's Alley, the Quaker City Dye Works, and two schools, the Thomas K. Finletter School and Olney High School.

References

Streets in Philadelphia